Sir Michael Charles Gerrard Peat  (born 16 November 1949) is an English retired accountant and courtier. He was the Principal Private Secretary to Charles, Prince of Wales and Camilla, Duchess of Cornwall between 2002 and 2011.

Life and career
Peat was born in 1949 and is great-grandson of William Barclay Peat, founder of the accountancy firm of Peat Marwick. He was educated at Eton College and Trinity College, University of Oxford, where he received an MA degree. He later attended the INSEAD in Fontainebleau, France, and obtained an MBA degree in 1977. He became an Associate Chartered Accountant in 1965 and a Fellow of the Institute of Chartered Accountants (FCA) in 1975.
 
Peat joined Peat Marwick Mitchell in 1972, became a partner in 1985. He led a 1986 study into the financial management of the Royal Household. From 1987 to 1990, he was the auditor of the Privy Purse  and administrative adviser to the Royal Household. In 1990, he was appointed Director of Finance and Property Services of the Royal Household, while remaining a partner at KPMG. He retired from KPMG in 1993, and in 1996 was appointed Keeper of the Privy Purse and Treasurer to the Queen and Receiver General of the Duchy of Lancaster. He retired from these positions in 2002, when he was appointed as private secretary to the Prince of Wales, taking control of the Office of the Prince of Wales. In 2005 he was made Principal Private Secretary to the Prince of Wales and the Duchess of Cornwall.

Peat stepped down as the Prince of Wales' private secretary in January 2011. He continued to undertake investment and financial projects for the Prince and provide advice on a part-time basis. Peat was replaced as principal private secretary by William Nye, formerly director of the National Security Secretariat, Cabinet Office and a career civil servant with experience working at the Home Office and the Treasury.

Peat became the new independent chairman of GEMS Education's Board of Directors in 2014.

Honours
Peat was made a Commander of the Royal Victorian Order (CVO) in 1994, promoted to a Knight Commander (KCVO) in 1998, and promoted again to Knight Grand Cross (GCVO) of the same order on 17 October 2011. Peat is a freemason.

He has also received the Queen Elizabeth II Version of the Royal Household Long and Faithful Service Medal for 20 years service to the Royal Family.

References

External links
"Sir Michael Peat: Right hand man." BBC. 6 November 2003.
"Sir Michael Peat: The royal axe man." BBC. 13 November 2003.
"The Guardian profile: Sir Michael Peat." The Guardian. 25 February 2005.

′

1949 births
Living people
Knights Grand Cross of the Royal Victorian Order
People educated at Eton College
Alumni of Trinity College, Oxford
Members of the Household of the Prince of Wales
INSEAD alumni
English accountants
KPMG people
GEMS schools
Freemasons of the United Grand Lodge of England